Brabazon Newcomen (1688 – June 1766) was an Anglo-Irish politician.

Newcomen was the Member of Parliament for Kilbeggan in the Irish House of Commons from 1713 to 1727.

References

1688 births
1766 deaths
18th-century Anglo-Irish people
Irish MPs 1713–1714
Irish MPs 1715–1727
Members of the Parliament of Ireland (pre-1801) for County Westmeath constituencies
Newcomen family